Simon Aspelin and Paul Hanley were the defending champions, but they were eliminated in the quarterfinal by Jérémy Chardy and Paul-Henri Mathieu.
Marc López and David Marrero defeated Jérémy Chardy and Paul-Henri Mathieu 6–3, 2–6, [10–8] in the final.

Seeds

Draw

Draw

References
 Main Draw

Doubles